The El Cortijo Polo Club is a sports ground near Lima, Peru. In September 2019, it was announced as one of the venues to host cricket matches in the 2019 South American Cricket Championship, a Twenty20 International (T20I) cricket tournament.

List of five-wicket hauls

Twenty20 Internationals

See also
 Peru national cricket team

References

External links
 
 El Cortijo Polo Club Pitch A Ground at ESPNcricinfo
 El Cortijo Polo Club Pitch B Ground at ESPNcricinfo

Sport in Peru
Polo clubs